Botija is a musical instrument.

Botija may also refer to:

 Botija, Cáceres, a municipality in the province of Cáceres, Extremadura, Spain
 Botijas River of Puerto Rico
 El Botija, fictional character played by Édgar Vivar
 La Botija, village in Ayacucho Department, San Luis, Argentina
 Botija de mi país, 1987 album by Uruguayan musician Rubén Rada
 , Spanish songwriter (see :Category:Songs written by Rafael Pérez-Botija)

See also 
Botijo, a traditional Spanish porous clay container designed to contain water